Beck – Öga för öga (English: Beck – Eye For An Eye) is a 1998 Swedish police film about Martin Beck, directed by Kjell Sundvall.

Cast 
 Peter Haber as Martin Beck
 Mikael Persbrandt as Gunvald Larsson
 Stina Rautelin as Lena Klingström
 Per Morberg as Joakim Wersén
 Ingvar Hirdwall as Martin Beck's neighbour
 Rebecka Hemse as Inger (Martin Beck's daughter)
 Fredrik Ultvedt as Jens Loftsgård
 Michael Nyqvist as John Banck
 Anna Ulrica Ericsson as Yvonne Jäder
 Peter Hüttner as Oljelund
 Bo Höglund as Mats (the waiter)
 Lena T. Hansson as Karin Lofjärd
 Göran Ragnerstam as Erik Aronsson
 Catarina Cavalli as Karin Lofjärd (as young)
 Göran Forsmark as Nils Mogren

References

External links 

1998 television films
1998 films
Films directed by Kjell Sundvall
Martin Beck films
1990s Swedish-language films
1998 crime films
1990s police procedural films
1990s Swedish films